Thomas Harvey Oberg (born August 7, 1945) is a former American football defensive back who played for the Denver Broncos of the National Football League (NFL). He played college football at Portland State University.

References 

1945 births
Living people
People from Clackamas, Oregon
Sportspeople from the Portland metropolitan area
Players of American football from Oregon
American football defensive backs
Oregon State Beavers football players
Portland State Vikings football players
Denver Broncos players